Bow Castle is the remains of an iron-age broch near the Gala Water, in the Scottish Borders area of Scotland, in the parish of Stow. It is a scheduled monument.

Description
Bow Castle stands on level ground on the edge of a steep slope southwest of the valley of the Gala Water. The broch has a wall 4.1 metres thick, enclosing an area 9.7 metres in diameter.

The broch is one of only three remaining in the Borders; the other two are Torwoodlee Broch, and Edin's Hall Broch.

Excavations
It was excavated in 1890 when pottery, including some 2nd-century Roman amphora fragments, were found. In 1922 a 2nd-century Roman enamelled bronze brooch in the form of a cockerel was found among the ruins of the wall.

Information concerning the dating and use of the broch is limited due to the lack of modern excavations. However, Torwoodlee Broch, two miles to the north, was built and destroyed during the Roman occupations of southern Scotland and it is likely that Bow Castle shared a similar history.

References

Further reading
Curle, J. (1892) 'Notes on two brochs recently discovered at Bow, Midlothian, and Torwoodlee, Selkirkshire', ''Proc Soc Antiq Scot, vol. 26, Pages 68–70

External links

Archaeological sites in the Scottish Borders
Brochs
Scheduled monuments in Scotland